Çayırova railway station is a railway station in Çayırova, Turkey. It is one of two stations (the other being Fatih) located within the campus of the Gebze Technical University. The station was originally built in 1954 by the Turkish State Railways and between 1969 and 2013, it was a stop along the Haydarpaşa suburban. In 2013, the station was closed and subsequently demolished to make way for a new station and the widening of the railway.  The Çayırova station was structurally completed in 2014, along with the other eight stations located between Pendik and Gebze; but due to delays with the project, the station is not served by any train. Commuter rail service resumed on 13 March 2019.

The station has two tracks with an island platform and one express track on the south side for high-speed and intercity trains.

References

Railway stations in Kocaeli Province
Railway stations opened in 1954
Gebze
1954 establishments in Turkey